Berthaud is a surname. Notable people with that surname include:

 Dominique Berthaud (born 1952), French former footballer and manager
 Fabienne Berthaud (born 1966), French writer, actress, screenwriter, and director
 Lise Berthaud (born 1982), French violist